Horizon West is a census-designated place and unincorporated area in Orange County, Florida, United States. The population was 14,000 at the 2010 census. It is part of the Orlando–Kissimmee–Sanford, Florida Metropolitan Statistical Area.

Horizon West includes five designated mixed-use villages, namely the Village of Bridgewater, Lakeside Village, Hickory Nut, Village I and Village F., surrounded by greenbelts as well as a town center.  The concept was adopted in 1995 by Orange County. As of 2017, Horizon West can be considered one of the fast growing master-planned communities nationwide.

Geography
Horizon West is located in southwestern Orange County, directly north of Walt Disney World Resort. It was a newly defined area as of the 2010 census. State Road 429, the Daniel Webster Western Beltway, runs through the CDP, connecting Ocoee to the north with Four Corners and Interstate 4 to the south.

Demographics

References

External links
Horizon West Retrospective Report
Horizon West Information

Unincorporated communities in Orange County, Florida
Census-designated places in Orange County, Florida
Greater Orlando
Census-designated places in Florida
Unincorporated communities in Florida
Planned communities in Florida